Jasrin Jusron (born 2 February 1936) was an Indonesian footballer. He competed in the men's tournament at the 1956 Summer Olympics.

References

External links
 
 

1936 births
Living people
Indonesian footballers
Indonesia international footballers
Olympic footballers of Indonesia
Footballers at the 1956 Summer Olympics
Place of birth missing (living people)
Association football forwards
PSIS Semarang players